Kamu Mukherjee (14 June 1931 – 6 December 2003) was a Bengali actor, best known for his role as Mandar Bose in Sonar Kella and Harun in Sandip Ray's first film Phatik Chand.

Career
Mukherjee's first film appearance was in the 1959 film Sonar Harin with Uttam Kumar, Chhabi Biswas and Bhanu Bandopadhyay. He had gone to Satyajit Ray's house and approached Ray to act in his films and, thereafter, he worked with Ray in nine films. Mukherjee is known for his performances in different types of roles, both serious and comic, in Ray's films. His acting in the knife throwing scene in the film Joi Baba Felunath  is one of the more remembered scenes from the filmmaker's oeuvre. He also starred in the films of Goutam Ghosh, Buddhadev Dashgupta and Arabinda Mukhopadhyay . Mukherjee died at the age of 72 on 6 December 2003 from rheumatoid arthritis in his home in Kolkata.

Selected filmography
 Sonar Harin (1959) as Abdulla
 Charulata (1964) as cameo (uncredited) 
 Nayak (1966) as Pritish
 Kokhono Megh
 Kamallata (1969) 
 Goopy Gyne Bagha Byne (1969) as cameo (uncredited) 
 Nishachar
 Mouchak (1974) 
 Sonar Kella (1974) as Mandar Bose
 Sawamsiddha
 Hangsaraj (1976) 
 Shatranj Ke Khilari (1977) 
  Joi Baba Felunath (1979) as Arjun
 Paka Dekha (1980) as a police constable 
 Heerak Rajar Deshe (1980) as sentry in the treasury 
 Phatik Chand (film) (1983) as Harun
 Paar (film) (1984) as the sardar of a jute mill
 Abir
 Phera (1988) as Mantu Dutta
 Shakha Proshakha (1990) as a domestic help at the Majumder house
 Goopy Bagha Phire Elo (1992)

References

External links
 

Male actors in Bengali cinema
Male actors from Kolkata
1931 births
2003 deaths
20th-century Indian male actors